Sport Lisboa e Benfica, commonly known as Benfica, is a professional handball team based in Lisbon, Portugal.

Benfica play in the top tier domestic league, Andebol 1, and hold home matches at the Pavilhão da Luz Nº 2. Since its inception in 1932, Benfica have won 7 Portuguese League titles, 6 Portuguese Cups, 2 Portuguese League Cups, and 7 Portuguese Super Cups. Internationally, Benfica won the EHF European League in 2021–22, becoming the first Portuguese club to win the competition.

In addition to the club's men's reserve team, Benfica B, playing in the second division, Benfica also has a women's team, who are the current Portuguese champions, having won 8 League titles, 7 Cups, and 2 Super Cups.

History

Beginning
Founded on 8 May 1932, Benfica's handball section endured a troubled start shortly after being founded. It was inactive from 1939 to 1942–43 because of a conflict between Benfica and the Portuguese Handball Federation. Until the 1960s, handball was played by eleven players, and after 1962–63, in another dispute with the federation, Benfica closed the eleven players team and opted for the current team handball.
The handball section did not achieve success until 1961–62, being overshadowed by the football, cycling, basketball and roller hockey sections of the club during that time.

Golden years
After a period of dominance by crosstown rivals Sporting CP, Benfica experienced great success in the 1980s and early 1990s, when was led by coach Eugene Troffin, and later by Ângelo Pintado, along with players such as Paulo Bunze, Swedish international Fredrik Appelgren, Dogărescu, Covaciu and Drăgăniță, goalkeeper João Santa Bárbara, wingman Mário Gentil, Vasco Vasconcelos, Luís Lopes and Rui Ferreira; Benfica won four national championships, three Portuguese Cup and two Portuguese Super Cup.

Decay
In the 1997–98 season, club president João Vale e Azevedo decided to shut down the section. It was restarted in the next season, but from the Regional Championship, four divisions away from the top flight.

Rebuilding years
In 2005, after years in anonymity, Benfica hired former ABC Braga coach, Aleksander Donner, on a three-year deal.
Because of a dispute between Liga and the Handball Federation, which managed the Divisão de Elite, there were two simultaneous championships. In the 2005–06 season, Benfica played in the Divisão de Elite. In 2006–07, Benfica joined the Liga Portuguesa de Andebol along with Sporting CP. During that season, Benfica won their first title since 1994, the League Cup. In the following season, Benfica finally achieved their first league title since 1990. Despite the success, Aleksander Donner did not renew his contract at the end of the season.

Recent years
To replace Donner, Benfica hired José António Silva, who won three titles in three years: the 2008–09 League Cup, 2010–11 Portuguese Cup and 2010 Super Cup. In the 2010–11 season, Benfica reached the final of the EHF Challenge Cup, but lost to Slovene side RK Cimos Koper. In 2011–12, José António Silva was replaced by another former ABC Braga coach, Jorge Rito. With him, Benfica finished fourth in league for the first time. On 2 September 2012, Jorge Rito won Benfica's fourth Super Cup trophy. The season ended with only a second place in the league. In 2013–14, Benfica's performances worsened, and the team finished the league in fourth place. Jorge Rito did not renew his contract and was replaced by Mariano Ortega. On 3 April 2016, Benfica, who had beaten rivals FC Porto in the semi-finals the day before, beat Lisbon rivals Sporting in the final and conquered their fifth Portuguese Cup, ending a four-year trophy drought.

Current squad
Squad for the 2022–23 season

Goalkeepers
 16  Nikola Zorić
 25  Sergey Hernández
 41  Gustavo Capdeville
Left wingers
8  Jonas Källman
 27  Arnaud Bingo
Right wingers
 14  Afonso Mendes
 19  Carlos Martins
 23  Ole Rahmel
Line players
 13  Paulo Moreno (c)
 22  Alexis Borges
 77  Vladimir Vranjes
 99  Guilherme Carvalho

Left backs
9  Arnau García
 28  Leandro Semedo
 34  Luciano Silva
 44  Petar Đorđić
Central backs
5  Martim Ferraz
7  Ádám Juhász
 24  Ander Izquierdo
 97  Ricardo Rocha
Right backs
 11  Belone Moreira 
 30  Demis Grigoraș
 33  Tadej Kljun

Results in international competition
Note: Benfica score is always listed first.H = home match; A = away match

Honours
According to Benfica's official website

Domestic competitions
 Portuguese League
 Winners (7): 1961–62, 1974–75, 1981–82, 1982–83, 1988–89, 1989–90, 2007–08
 Portuguese Cup
 Winners (6): 1984–85, 1985–86, 1986–87, 2010–11, 2015–16, 2017–18
 Portuguese League Cup
 Winners (2): 2006–07, 2008–09
 Portuguese Super Cup
 Winners (7): 1989, 1993, 2010, 2012, 2016, 2018, 2022

International competitions
 EHF European League
 Winners (1): 2021–22
 EHF European Cup
 Runners-up (2): 2010–11, 2015–16

Women's honours
According to Benfica's official website
 Portuguese League
 Winners (8): 1983–84, 1985–86, 1986–87, 1988–89, 1989–90, 1991–92, 1992–93, 2021–22
 Portuguese Cup
 Winners (7): 1984–85, 1985–86, 1986–87, 1987–88, 1988–89, 1991–92, 2021–22
 Portuguese Super Cup
 Winners (3): 1990, 1992, 2022

References

Further reading

External links
  

 
Handball
Portuguese handball clubs
Handball clubs established in 1932
1932 establishments in Portugal